Merry Pemberton, also known as Gimmick Girl and Merry, Girl of 1000 Gimmicks is a fictional character in the DC Comics Universe. She is the adoptive sister of Sylvester Pemberton. Merry Pemberton first appeared in Star-Spangled Comics #81 in June 1948, and ran through #90 (March 1949). She was created by writer Otto Binder.

Fictional character biography
Born Merry Creamer, she is adopted by Mr. and Mrs. Sylvester Pemberton Sr., the parents of the original Star-Spangled Kid. She soon adopts a crime-fighting persona and works with her brother and Stripesy, ultimately supplanting them in their own feature.

According to Jess Nevins' Encyclopedia of Golden Age Superheroes, Merry "fights her male opposite, the Gimmick Guy; Presto, a criminal stage magician; and the Rope, who uses rope-themed gimmicks".

Merry eventually marries Henry King Sr., the supervillain known as the original Brain Wave. They had one son named Henry King Jr. who became the super-hero Brainwave, a member of Infinity Inc. which was founded by his uncle, Sylvester Pemberton Jr., the Star-Spangled Kid.

References to Merry before the Crisis on Infinite Earths note that she died at some point. More recently, however, she has been portrayed as alive. She appears in Young Justice as a member of Old Justice, a team of former Golden Age sidekicks who feel modern teen heroes are risking themselves and others.

During the Sins of Youth event it is revealed that she particularly resents Stargirl, who at that time had taken her brother's title as the Star-Spangled Kid. Merry assists dozens of other superheroes, most of whom had changed ages, in battling Klarion the Witch Boy and other villains. Old Justice finds itself in the parental role of supervising many super-powered adolescents. She makes her peace with Stargirl, who has become an adult woman temporarily. During a multi-character battle in Alaska, Stargirl even saves Merry from an attacking, younger Amazo. By the end of the story Merry has made her peace with both Stargirl and younger heroes in general.

After the JSA rescues her son from Black Adam and Mister Mind, Merry takes him back into her care.

Legacy
In Seven Soldiers #0, a new character named Gimmix appears. Credited as Jacqueline Pemberton, Merry's estranged daughter, Gimmix uses her Bag of Trix to do light hero work, mostly appearing at conventions talking about how she met up with better-known heroes such as Aquaman and Booster Gold. Some of her gimmicks are Zoom Glasses, Anti-Spider lipstick, "What Every Girl Needs" ice spray, and an unnamed gimmick which can turn water into wine (although not very good wine). Jacqueline becomes part of an ill-fated team of six superheroes rounded up by Greg Saunders and is killed by the Sheeda, an advanced race which feeds on its own history to survive.

Gimmix is shown attending group therapy for Metas.

In 52, it is revealed that Jacqueline was the head of the Pemberton Estate, and since her death has not been officially recorded, the estate is bought by Lex Luthor for the trademarks of Skyman and Infinity Inc.

Powers and abilities
Merry had no superpowers but wore a costume that contained various devices and gimmicks within which she used as weapons to fight crime.

In other media

Television
 The existence of Merry Pemberton is featured as a backstory in Stargirl, with her marriage to Brain Wave remaining intact. When she found out that Icicle had killed Sylvester during the Injustice Society's attack on the Justice Society of America, she confronted him. To prove his loyalty to Icicle and the Injustice Society, Brain Wave killed her and covered up her death to his son, Henry King Jr. Years later, Henry found out what his father did to his mother, but was killed as well.

References

External links
Toonopedia article

Comics characters introduced in 1948
DC Comics female superheroes
DC Comics superheroes
Golden Age superheroes
Superheroes who are adopted
Characters created by Otto Binder
Characters created by Grant Morrison
Comics characters introduced in 2005